The Trade Union Confederation of Togolese Workers (CSTT) is a national trade union center in Togo. It is affiliated with the International Trade Union Confederation.

CSTT emerged from the Conféderation africain des travailleurs croyants, adopting the name Confédération togolaise des travailleurs croyants (CTTC) in 1962. CTTC changed name to CSTT in 1968.

References

Trade unions in Togo
International Trade Union Confederation
Trade unions established in 1962